The 1977 Northwestern Wildcats team represented Northwestern University during the 1977 Big Ten Conference football season. In their fifth year under head coach John Pont, the Wildcats compiled a 1–10 record (1–8 against Big Ten Conference opponents) and finished in last place in the Big Ten Conference.

The team's offensive leaders were quarterback Scott Stranski with 541 passing yards, Dave Mishler with 520 rushing yards, and Mark Bailey with 347 receiving yards.

Schedule

Roster

Season summary

Ohio St

Homecoming

References

Northwestern
Northwestern Wildcats football seasons
Northwestern Wildcats football